Tang Yijun (born March 1961) is a Chinese politician who currently serves as chairman of Chinese People's Political Consultative Conference's Jiangxi provincial committee since January 2023. 

Previously, he served as Minister of Justice of China from 2020 to 2023, governor of Liaoning Province from 2017 to 2020, deputy party secretary of Zhejiang Province from 2017 to 2020, party secretary of Ningbo City from 2016 to 2017, and deputy party secretary of Ningbo City from 2005 to 2016.

Biography 
Tang is considered native to Ju County, Shandong, but spent most of his life in Zhejiang. He joined the workforce in July 1977, working for communes in Qingtian County, Yongkang County, and Lishui County, shortly after the death of Mao. Between 1980 and 1984, shortly after economic reforms began, Tang was a clerical worker at the Lishui party school. From September 1984 to July 1986, he studied political economics in the theoretical undergraduate program of the Zhejiang Provincial Party School. He was assigned work in the theory division of publicity department of Zhejiang Provincial Party Committee.

In October 1985, Tang joined the Chinese Communist Party. In 1991, Tang began working for the General Office of the Zhejiang party committee under Li Zemin. In July 1997, he became secretary-general of the Zhoushan party organization. In June 2002, he was named secretary-general of the Zhejiang Commission for Discipline Inspection. From September 2003 to July 2006, he studied economics and management in the on-the-job graduate program of the Correspondence College of the Central Party School. In June 2005, he was named deputy party chief and Discipline Inspection secretary of Ningbo. In February 2010, he became the chief of the Political and Legal Affairs Commission of Ningbo. In February 2011, he was named chairman of the Ningbo People's Political Consultative Conference.

In May 2016, Tang became acting mayor of Ningbo. In August 2016, he became Communist Party Secretary of Ningbo and a member of the Zhejiang provincial party standing committee. In May 2017, Tang was named deputy party chief of Zhejiang province. He served in the role for five months before being appointed as acting governor of Liaoning in October 2017. On April 29, 2020, he was appointed Minister of Justice, succeeding Fu Zhenghua.

Tang was elected as chairman of the Jiangxi Provincial Committee of the Chinese People's Political Consultative Conference on 14 January 2023. Succeeded by executive vice president of the Supreme People's Court He Rong, Tang was removed from the office of Minister of Justice of China on 24 February 2023.

References 

1961 births
Alternate members of the 19th Central Committee of the Chinese Communist Party
Chinese Communist Party politicians from Shandong
People's Republic of China politicians from Shandong
Governors of Liaoning
Living people
Mayors of Ningbo
Ministers of Justice of the People's Republic of China